The National Archives of Zimbabwe are the national archives of Zimbabwe. They are located in Harare.

The National Archives were established by an Act of Parliament in 1935, now known as the National Archives Act 1896. The Archives are the storehouse of the nation's documented history. They include the archives of the former Southern Rhodesia, and are formed of a network of five regional archives divided into eight provinces. From 1953-1963, they were the central repository of the National Archives of Rhodesia and Nyasaland.

Its Audiovisual Unit was established in 1988. Its collect encompasses 15,000 audiovisual materials about Zimbabwe. Its Oral History Programme collects and preserves oral interviews of people whose contribution to Zimbabwean history has been considerable but under-documented.

The first Director at National Archives of Zimbabwe at independence was Angeline Kamba. Angeline Kamba is the only female Director to head this Department upto 2021. The latest Director was Ivan Munhamu Murambiwa who passed on 2021. In 2018 National Archives of Zimbabwe started Community Archives Project. The following were done Arcturus High School, Harare Girls High School, Mbungo Zion Christian Centre, Bikita, Zvishavane and currently Kariba.

See also 
 National Library of Zimbabwe
 List of national archives
 Central African Archives
 ESARBICA
 Zimbabwe's "Capturing a Fading National Memory project

References

External links 
 

Zimbabwe
Zimbabwean culture
History of Zimbabwe
Harare